Caloptilia suberinella is a moth of the family Gracillariidae. It is known from the Netherlands, Sweden, Norway, Finland, Denmark, Germany, Switzerland, Poland, Latvia, Estonia, Ukraine, Russia and China. It was recently recorded from North America (British Columbia).

The wingspan is 14–15 mm. The forewings are brown with dark brown and dirty white variegations.

The larvae feed on Betula species, including Betula platyphylla. They mine the leaves of their host plant at first, but later lives in a rolled leaf.

References

suberinella
Moths of Europe
Moths of Asia
Moths of North America
Moths described in 1848